Anachrostis is a genus of moths of the family Erebidae.

Taxonomy
The genus has previously been classified in the subfamily Catocalinae of the family Noctuidae.

Description
Palpi upturned with second joint reaching vertex of head. Antennae minutely ciliated. Forewings with vein 5 angle of cell. Vein 6 from below upper angle and vein 7 from the angle. Veins 8 and 10 stalked and vein 9 absent. Hindwings with stalked veins 3 and 4, whereas vein 5 absent.

Species
Anachrostis amamiana Sugi, 1982
Anachrostis fulvicilia Hampson, 1926
Anachrostis indistincta Wileman & South, 1917
Anachrostis marginata Wileman & South, 1917
Anachrostis metaphaea Hampson, 1926
Anachrostis minutissima Sugi, 1982
Anachrostis nigripuncta Hampson, 1893
Anachrostis nigripunctalis (Wileman, 1911)
Anachrostis ochracea Hampson, 1926
Anachrostis rufula Hampson, 1926
Anachrostis siccana (Walker, 1863)
Anachrostis straminea Rothschild, 1915

References

Hypenodinae
Noctuoidea genera